Daret is a surname. Notable people with the surname include:

Jacques Daret ( 1404– 1470), Flemish painter
Jean Daret (1613–1668), Flemish artist
Pierre Daret (1604–1678), French painter and engraver
Reno Jean Daret III (b. 1948) American philatelist